Cassidula is a genus of small air-breathing salt marsh snails, pulmonate gastropod mollusks in the family Ellobiidae.

Species and subspecies 
 Cassidula angulifera (Petit, 1841)
 Cassidula aurisfelis (Bruguière, 1789)
 Cassidula doliolum (Petit de la Saussaye, 1842)
 Cassidula granosula (Iredale, 1936) 
 Cassidula labrella (Deshayes, 1830)
 Cassidula multiplicata (Martens, 1865)
 Cassidula nucleus (Gmelin, 1791)
 Cassidula philippinarum Hidalgo, 1888
 Cassidula plecotrematoides Möllendorff, 1901
 Cassidula plecotrematoides japonica Möllendorff, 1901
 Cassidula rugata (Menke, 1843)
 Cassidula schmackeriana Möllendorff, 1895
 Cassidula sowerbyana (Pfeiffer, 1853)
 Cassidula sulculosa (Mousson, 1849)
 Cassidula vespertilionis (Lesson, 1831)
 Cassidula zonata H. Adams & A. Adams, 1855
Species brought into synonymy
 Cassidula bilabiata Hedley, 1912: synonym of Cassidula zonata H. Adams & A. Adams, 1855
 Cassidula corona (Gmelin, 1791): synonym of Melongena corona (Gmelin, 1791)
 Cassidula decussata H. Adams & A. Adams, 1855: synonym of Cassidula sowerbyana (Pfeiffer, 1853)
 Cassidula kraussi (Küster, 1844): synonym of Cassidula labrella (Deshayes, 1830) (junior synonym)
 Cassidula lutescens Pfeiffer, 1856: synonym of Cassidula labrella (Deshayes, 1830) (junior synonym)

References

 Thiele, J. (1929-1935). Handbuch der systematischen Weichtierkunde. Jena, Gustav Fischer, 1154 pp. Vol. 1 part 1: 1-376 [between 4 September and 21 October 1929]; Vol. 1 part 2: 377-778 [before 31 October 1931]; Vol. 2 part 3: 779-1022 [before 19 January 1934]; Vol. 2 part 4: i-iv, 1023-1154, i-vi for volume 1
 Martins, A. M. de F. (1996) Anatomy and systematics of the Western Atlantic Ellobiidae (Gastropoda: Pulmonata). Malacologia 37: 163-332.
 Vaught, K.C. (1989). A classification of the living Mollusca. American Malacologists: Melbourne, FL (USA). . XII, 195 pp
 GBIF info at:

External links
 Swainson, W. (1840). A treatise on malacology or shells and shell-fish. London, Longman. viii + 419 pp
 Conrad T. A. (1853). "Synopsis of the Genera Cassidula, Humph., and of a proposed new genus Athleta". Proceedings of the Academy of Natural Sciences of Philadelphia 6: 448-449.
 

Ellobiidae
Gastropod genera